Little Falls Dam, also known as Brookmont Dam, is a low dam on the Potomac River, built in 1959 to divert water for the water supply system of Washington, D.C., just below Mather Gorge, about  above Chain Bridge. The  dam was constructed by the U.S. Army Corps of Engineers, which is responsible for the D.C. water supply. It contributes roughly 15 to 20 percent of water intake from the Potomac to the Washington Aqueduct, rising to 30 percent in time of drought.

The dam blocks fish migration routes several miles below their natural end at the Great Falls of the Potomac River. It has been termed "the drowning machine" in recognition of its danger to boaters and swimmers who can be trapped in the flow at its base. The dam was altered in 2000 to improve fish passage. The profile at the base has also been altered to reduce the chances of swimmer entrapment beneath the surface.

References

See also
Little Falls (Potomac River)

Brookmont, Maryland
Crossings of the Potomac River
Dams in Maryland
United States Army Corps of Engineers dams
Water in Washington, D.C.